Iridomyrmex anderseni is an ant species of the genus Iridomyrmex. Nothing is known of its biology. One single specimen has been only been collected in South Australia. The species was described by Shattuck in 1993.

References

Iridomyrmex
Hymenoptera of Australia
Insects described in 1993